Ravensdale (Irish: Gleann na bhFiach. Also sometimes known in Irish as Dubhleargaidh or An Dúleargaidh, which can be anglicised as Doolargy) is a hamlet and area located at the foothills of the Cooley Mountains on the Cooley Peninsula in the north of County Louth in Ireland. It is positioned approximately 8 km to the north of Dundalk, County Louth. The dual carriageway between Dublin and Belfast runs past it, and the R174 connects it with Jenkinstown. The district is heavily wooded and the housing is suburban/rural. Ravensdale is part of the parish of Ballymacscanlon and Lordship; however, the northern part of Ravensdale is part of the parish area of Jonesborough and Dromintee. 

The Ravensdale Forest nature trail is located in the wooded demesne of the former seat of the Barons Clermont, which straddles the border between County Armagh in Northern Ireland and County Louth in the Republic of Ireland. Ravensdale Park, also known as Ravensdale Castle, the country house itself, was destroyed during the political troubles of the early 1920s. Parts of it were reused during the construction of Church of St. Brigid, Glassdrummond in 1927. It is believed that Ravensdale was named after Ravensdale Park of Derbyshire.  The Flurry River, which flows through Ravensdale and enters Dundalk Bay at Bellurgan, was in past times an excellent trout and salmon fishery.

References 

Geography of County Louth